The M816 Medium Wrecker is part of the M809 series of 5-ton 6x6 military trucks. It was made by AM General starting in 1970.  It has a revolving hydraulic crane with an extending boom that can extend from 10–18 ft with a maximum lift capacity of 20,000 lb with outriggers and boom jacks to the ground. The boom capacity depends on boom extension and placements of truck outriggers and boom jacks. With boom full out and no outriggers, the capacity is only 3000 lb. The boom elevates to 45 degrees, swings 270.

The fuel consumption rate is 5 mpg. The towing capacity is 14 tons on road or 10 tons cross country (or off-road). The front winch has a 20Klb capacity and the rear winch is 45klb capacity.

These trucks were specially built for the United States Army to pull medium duty equipment through non-incorporated terrain.

References

 Army Manual TM 9-2320-260-20
 

Military recovery vehicles
Military trucks of the United States
Military vehicles introduced in the 1970s
Off-road vehicles